The ATS D5 was a Formula One racing car manufactured and raced by the Team ATS racing team during the 1981 and 1982 Formula One seasons. Originally known as the HGS1 in 1981, it was updated for 1982 and designated the D5. It was powered by the Ford-Cosworth DFV V8. The team scored five points with the chassis across the two seasons it was raced.

Development
The chassis was designed by Hervé Guilpin and Tim Wadrop and was updated by Don Halliday for the 1982 season, for which it was known as the D5. It utilised an aluminium monocoque and was powered by a Ford Cosworth DFV V8.

Racing history

1981 
The HGS1 made its first appearance partway through the 1981 Formula One season at the Belgian Grand Prix, where it was driven by Slim Borgudd. However, he failed to qualify for the race as well as the following two events. At the British Grand Prix he qualified in 21st and then on went on to finish sixth. This proved to be Team ATS's only point of the year.

1982 
Team ATS continued to use the HGS1, now designated as the D5, for the 1982 Formula One season. Manfred Winkelhock joined the team as a replacement for Borgudd and Eliseo Salazar was the second driver. The pair started the season with promise, finishing 9th and 10th in South Africa and Winkelhock then finished fifth at the Brazilian race for two points. Salazar finished fifth at Imola although this race saw a reduced field of entrants due to a boycott by most of the FOCA aligned teams.

No further points were scored for the remainder of the season. The drivers would generally qualify towards the rear of the field although Winkelhock did start the United States Grand Prix from fifth on the grid. Reliability was often an issue with several retirements due to mechanical failures. There was the odd driver error, notably when Salazar collided with Brabham's Nelson Piquet at the 1982 German Grand Prix.

Complete Formula One World Championship results 
(key)

References

Bibliography

ATS Formula One cars